Hickey (Chinese: 喜祺) is a girl group under Star Master Entertainment. They debuted on September 14, 2018 with the single "Monkey World". It consists of seven members, Jia Xin, Mo Yao, Wen Zhe, An Qi, Ke Lan, Shangguan Xi Ai, and Xian Li.

Pre-Debut 
Mo Yao, Wen Zhe, An Qi, and Shangguan Xi Ai participated in the survival show Youth with You 2. An Qi ranked #6 and debuted in THE9.

Wen Zhe participated in the survival show Girls' Planet 999. She made it to the finale but ultimately did not debut.

Members 

 Jia Xin (佳歆) / Leader, Dancer, Vocalist
 Mo Yao (墨谣) / Vocalist, Rapper
 Wen Zhe (文哲) / Main Rapper
 An Qi (安崎) / Vocalist, Dancer
 Ke Lan (可岚) / Face of the Group, Vocalist, Dancer
 Shangguan Xi Ai (上官喜爱) / Vocalist, Rapper
 Xian Li (弦莉) / Youngest, Vocalist, Dancer

Discography

Extended Play

Singles

References

External links

YouTube

2018 establishments in China
Musical groups established in 2018
Mandopop musical groups
Chinese pop music groups
Chinese dance music groups
Mandarin-language singers
Produce 101
Idol Producer
 Girls Planet 999
Produce 101 (Chinese TV series) contestants
Chinese girl groups